Michael Dean Williams (born May 28, 1970) is a former American football defensive back who played one season with the San Francisco 49ers of the National Football League. He played college football at the University of California, Los Angeles and attended Crenshaw High School in South Los Angeles, California. He was also a member of the San Jose SaberCats of the Arena Football League.

References

External links
Just Sports Stats

Living people
1970 births
Players of American football from Los Angeles
American football defensive backs
UCLA Bruins football players
San Francisco 49ers players
San Jose SaberCats players
Crenshaw High School alumni